Dieringer is a surname. Notable people with the surname include:

Alex Dieringer (born 1993), American wrestler
Darel Dieringer (1926–1989), American stock car racing driver
Franz Xaver Dieringer (1811–1876), Roman Catholic theologian
Ray Dieringer, American basketball coach